José Hibert Ruíz Vázquez (born 25 May 1987) is a Mexican former footballer and manager. Since March 11, 2021, he is the manager of Correcaminos UAT that plays in the Liga de Expansión MX.

Pumas UNAM
In December 2015, it was announced that Ruiz would be joining Pumas UNAM in a season-long loan deal.

Honours

Club
Morelia
Copa MX (1): Apertura 2013
Supercopa MX (1): 2014

References

External links
 

1987 births
Living people
Sportspeople from León, Guanajuato
Querétaro F.C. footballers
Atlético Morelia players
Club León footballers
Club Universidad Nacional footballers
Chiapas F.C. footballers
Liga MX players
Association football midfielders
Footballers from Guanajuato
Mexican footballers